Stapel may refer to:
 Huub Stapel (born 1954) is a Dutch actor.
 Diederik Stapel (born 1966) is a Dutch former professor of social psychology at Tilburg University.
 Wilhelm Stapel (1882-1954) was the German editor of the antisemitic magazine Deutsches Volkstum.
 Stapel, Schleswig-Holstein, a municipality in Schleswig-Holstein, Germany